Chongqing Art Museum (also known as Chongqing Art Gallery or Chongqing Guotai Arts Center) is an art museum in Yuzhong District of Chongqing. Its main focus is on traditional Chinese painting, printmaking, and small sculptures.

Architecture

The building is well known for its striking architecture. Its outer structure consists of an interwoven pattern of beams. Red beams run north–south and black beams run east–west. The design is said to be inspired by Chopsticks and the traditional Chinese meal of Hot pot. The design has also been compared to the white fig tree, which is common in Chongqing.

References

2013 establishments in China
Art museums established in 2013
Museums in Chongqing
Art museums and galleries in China